The Diamond Springs Stage Station Site,  in Keith County, Nebraska near Brule, Nebraska was the site of a stagecoach station in 1859.  It was listed on the National Register of Historic Places in 1970.

It is at elevation about five feet above the river level.

It was deemed "of importance archeologically because of the relatively undisturbed remains present here of a station used by both the Pony Express and the Overland Stage in the mid 1800s. This station was apparently built in 1859 by Russell, Majors and Waddell after that firm bought out Jones and Russell's Leavenworth and Pike's Peak Express Company."

No above-ground structures remain, but the site has never been ploughed and the ground shows evidence of building areas.

References

External links

Stagecoach stations in Nebraska
National Register of Historic Places in Keith County, Nebraska
Buildings and structures completed in 1859